Bahretal is a municipality in the Sächsische Schweiz-Osterzgebirge district in Saxony, Germany.  It is situated in the northeastern foothills of the Erzgebirge (Ore Mountains), between Bad Gottleuba-Berggießhübel and Dohna. It consists of several small villages, situated in the valleys of the rivers Bahre and Seidewitz as well as on the heights between the valleys.

The municipality is named after the small river Bahre which flows through it. Its source is located 1.5 km north of Breitenau in Bad Gottleuba-Berggießhübel at 505 m. It flows into the Seidewitz near Zuschendorf. In order to prevent flooding, a retention basin was built between Borna-Gersdorf and Friedrichswalde-Ottendorf in 1970.

Municipality subdivisions
Bahretal consists of the following villages:
Borna
Friedrichswalde
Gersdorf
Göppersdorf
Nentmannsdorf
Niederseidewitz
Ottendorf
Wingendorf

History

Borna
Borna probably belonged to the castle of Dohna at first. In the beginning of the 15th century it became part of the lands of Schloss Weesenstein. It changed hands quite often, between the owners of Liebstadt, Weesenstein, Gersdorf, Ottendorf, Krebs and Giesenstein in the subsequent years.  In 1731, Borna was in the possession of the count Maurice de Saxe. The village church was first mentioned in 1388. It belonged to the parish of Pirna, and after the Reformation was introduced in 1539 to Liebstadt.  In 1894, Borna built its own office.

Friedrichswalde
Friedrichswalde belonged to the Schloss Weesenstein. The church was first mentioned in 1311, and belonged to the parish of Pirna.

Gersdorf
Until the 17th century Gersdorf was divided into two villages: Obergersdorf (also: Gabel) and Niedergersdorf. They initially belonged to Dohna, but fell to the Margraves of Dresden. A manor was built in Gersdorf, and an artificial ruin was built around 1800.

References

External links

Pictures of Borna Pictures of the Photothecque of the Sächsischen Landes- und Universitätsbibliothek Dresden
Pictures of Bahretal
Migratory pictures by Bahretal

Populated places in Sächsische Schweiz-Osterzgebirge